David Black (born April 13, 1962 in Oshawa, Ontario) is a former offensive lineman in the Canadian Football League.

He played for the Winnipeg Blue Bombers from 1985 to 1996 and spent a portion of the 1995 season with the Ottawa Rough Riders. Black was a CFL all-star in 1993 and a CFL Eastern all-star in 1989,1993 and 1994. His most notable performance was in the game where Matt Dunigan threw for 713 yards against the Edmonton Eskimos in which Black was recognized by the CFL as 'Offensive Lineman of the Week'. He attended Wilfrid Laurier University from 1983 to 1985. Black also attended Michigan State University for a brief period of time. In 2004, Black was inducted into the Winnipeg Blue Bombers Hall of Fame.

He was traded in 1995 from the Winnipeg Blue Bombers to the Ottawa Rough Riders where he spent three months of the season and was soon traded back to Winnipeg. Then soon after coming back Black retired.

References

1962 births
Canadian football offensive linemen
Living people
Ottawa Rough Riders players
Players of Canadian football from Ontario
Sportspeople from Oshawa
Wilfrid Laurier Golden Hawks football players
Winnipeg Blue Bombers players